Good Job or Good Job! may refer to:

Good Job (song), 2020 song by American recording artist Alicia Keys
Good Job!, 2020 video game published by Nintendo
Good Job! (album), 2005 album by the Japanese hip hop group Rip Slyme
Good Job, Brain!, quiz show and trivia podcast
Good Job, Good Job, 2009 South Korean television series
Good Job (TV series), 2022 South Korean television series